The 1937 International cricket season was from April 1937 to August 1937.

Season overview

June

Scotland in Ireland

New Zealand in England

July

Netherlands in England

August

England in Netherlands

References

1937 in cricket